Aleksandr Sergeyevich Askerov (born 26 July 1995) is a Russian windsurfer. He competed in the 2020 Summer Olympics in the Men's RS:X event.

References

External links
 
 
 

1995 births
Living people
Sportspeople from Sochi
Sailors at the 2020 Summer Olympics – RS:X
Russian male sailors (sport)
Russian windsurfers